Brajići is a small village in the municipality of Budva, Montenegro.

Demographics
According to the 2011 census, its population was 32.

References

Populated places in Budva Municipality